The following outline is provided as an overview of and topical guide to festivals:

Festival – celebration that focuses upon a theme, and may run for hours to weeks.  The theme of a festival might be an area of interest such as art, or an aspect of the community in which the festival is being held, such as the community's history or culture. Festivals are often periodical, for example, held annually.

The Types of festivals 

 Beer festival –
 Comedy festival –
 Esala Perahera festival –
 Film festival –
 Fire festival (Beltane) –
 Fire festival (the Japanese festival) –
 Folk festival – celebrates traditional folk crafts and folk music.
 Food festival –
 Harvest festival –
 Cultural harvest festivals –
 Language festivals
 Literary festival –
 Japanese Cultural Festival –
 Mela Festival –
 Music festival –
 Peanut Festival –
 Religious festival –
 Calendar of saints (Feast days) –
 Hindu festivals –
 List of Sikh festivals –
 Renaissance festival –
 Rock festival – a large-scale rock music concert, featuring multiple acts. Also called a "rock fest".
 Science festival –
 Sindhi festivals –
 Storytelling festival –
 Theatre festival –
 Vegetarian festivals and vegan food fests –
 Video gaming festival –
 Winter festivals –

Festival activities 
The activities or events of a festival may be primarily of the spectator or participatory variety, or a mixture of these.  A festival may include spectator or participatory variations of one or more of the following types of events or activities, among others.

 Ceremonies –
 Concerts, music –
 Competitions –
 Contests –
 Dancing events –
 Meals, eating, and drinking –
 Parades –
 Parties –
 Performances –
 Races –
 Singing –
 Speeches –
 Sports –

History of festivals 

History of festivals
 Feria
 List of Donington Park Festivals
 List of electronic music festivals
 List of machinima festivals

Specific festivals 
Following are festivals that are events (similar to a fair). They are typically hosted, and are held at a specific location.

Specific festivals by theme 

 List of celtic festivals
 List of dogwood festivals
 List of film festivals
 Animation festivals
 List of international animation festivals
 List of regional animation festivals
 List of music festivals
 Blues festivals
 List of Canadian blues festivals and venues
 List of heavy metal festivals
List of electronic music festivals
List of trance festivals
List of electronic dance music festivals
 List of jam band music festivals
 List of jazz festivals
 List of reggae festivals
 List of opera festivals

Specific festivals by region 

 List of festivals in Australia
 List of festivals in Canada
 List of Canadian blues festivals and venues
 List of festivals in Alberta
 List of festivals in Calgary
 List of festivals in Edmonton
 List of festivals in Quebec
 List of festivals in Colombia
 List of festivals in La Guajira
 List of festivals in Costa Rica
 List of festivals in Fiji
 List of festivals in Iran
 List of festivals in Japan
 List of festivals in Laos
 List of festivals in Macedonia
 List of festivals in Morocco
 List of festivals in Nepal
 List of festivals in the Philippines, known as Philippine Fiestas
 List of Bohol festivals
 List of festivals in Romania
 List of festivals in Turkey
 List of festivals in the United Kingdom
 List of festivals in the Isle of Man
 List of festivals in Vietnam
 List of festivals in the United States
 Festivals in California
 List of San Francisco Bay Area festivals and fairs
 Festivals in Florida
 List of Florida food festivals
 Festivals in Illinois
List of festivals in Chicago
 List of festivals in Louisiana
 List of festivals in New Jersey
 List of festivals in Pennsylvania

See also 

 Holiday
 List of holidays

References

External links 

 Festivals and events in the United States
 Festivals and events in the United States
 FestivalTrek - searchable database of festivals around the world
 Film festivals
 Movie festivals and events worldwide at the Internet Movie Database
 International Film Festival Database
 FilmFestivals.com
 Directory of International Film Festivals
 World's largest film festival list 
 Joobili - Timely Travel Inspirations for European festivals and events
 Music festivals
 Music festivals in North America
 Festival Family - Community Through Music - Listing of all North American Music Festivals
 Festivalsearcher - Listing of all European Summer Music Festivals
 Your Festival Guide - list, google map, and calendar of worldwide festivals
 Festival Network Online - searchable database of festivals for entertainers, vendors, etc.
 Music Festivals - List of Music Festivals in Melbourne and Tickets
 JamBase Festival Guide - List of Music Festivals on JamBase
 MTV Iggy - 2010 Must See Music Festivals
 Festival Planet - Information on Popular Music Festivals in 2010
 Rough Guide to festivals around the world

Festivals
Festivals
&